Concordia Tornados is the soccer team of the Concordia University Texas in the capital of Texas, Austin. It is affiliated with the American Southwest Conference of NCAA Division III.

The Tornados appeared in their first American Southwest Conference tournament in 2015, winning a quarterfinal versus the University of the Ozarks before losing a semifinal match to the University of Texas at Dallas. The Tornados started the 2015 season with a school-record seven game winning streak en route to a first-ever winning season, finishing the year with a record of 12–3–1. In 2021, the Tornados won their first American Southwest Conference championship, defeating Hardin-Simmons University 4–3 in a penalty shootout following a 1–1 draw.

See also 
Concordia Tornados women's soccer

External links 
Concordia men's soccer webpage

References

College men's soccer teams in the United States
Men's